The Minister of Justice is a minister in the government of New Zealand. The minister has responsibility for the formulation of justice policy and for the administration of law courts.

The current Minister of Justice is Kiri Allan.

History
The first Minister of Justice was appointed in 1870. This was followed in 1872 by the creation of the Department of Justice.

The Attorney-General is responsible for supervising New Zealand law and advising the Government on legal matters, and has ministerial jurisdiction over the Crown Law Office and the Parliamentary Counsel Office. The position is separate from that of 'Minister of Justice', though the two positions have sometimes been held by the same person, e.g. Geoffrey Palmer (1984 to 1989).

Responsibility for the police has never technically belonged to the Minister of Justice per se. Originally, the Minister of Defence was responsible. During the early 20th century, however, it became established that the person serving as Minister of Justice was also the minister in charge of the police. This continued until the election of the First Labour Government in 1935, when responsibility for the police became detached – the Minister of Police was eventually established as a full ministerial post in 1969.

In 1995, the Department of Justice was split into three parts – a Ministry of Justice would deal with policy matters, while the practical administration of the court system and the prison system would be given their own departments. This resulted in the creation of two new ministerial portfolios – Minister of Court and Minister of Corrections. The former has since been absorbed back into the Justice portfolio, but the latter is still independent.

List of justice ministers
Key

See also
Justice ministry
Law in New Zealand
New Zealand Ministry of Justice
Politics in New Zealand

References

External links
New Zealand Ministry of Justice

Justice
Public office-holders in New Zealand
Justice